Sharks is the sixteenth album by the British hard rock band UFO. It is the last album to feature longtime German lead guitarist Michael Schenker.

Track listing

There are reports of an unofficial Russian 18 track version of this cd with tracks from previous UFO albums but tracks not listed in the cover.

Bonus Japan 
 1. "Only You Can Rock Me" (Live)   
 2. "Too Hot to Handle" (Live)   
 3. "Rock Bottom" (Live)

Personnel

Band members
 Phil Mogg - vocals
 Michael Schenker - guitar
 Pete Way - bass guitar
 Aynsley Dunbar - drums

Additional musicians
 Mike Varney - guitar fills & outro guitar solo on "Fighting Man", producer
 Kevin Carlson  - keyboards
 Jesse Bradman - background vocals
 Luis Maldonado - background vocals

Production
Steve Fontano - producer, engineer, mixing, mastering
Jason D'Ottavio, John Anaya - assistant engineers
Tim Gennert - mastering

Charts

References

2002 albums
UFO (band) albums
Albums produced by Mike Varney
Shrapnel Records albums